Dalyup is a small town in Western Australia located about  south east of Perth between Munglinup and Esperance on the South Coast Highway in the Goldfields-Esperance region of Western Australia.

The town takes its name from the Dalyup River that is situated adjacent to the town. The name is Aboriginal in origin and thought to be the Noongar word for the western king parrot or hookbill. The townsite was gazetted on 18 May 1962, although there had been agricultural settlement in the area since 1896.

References 

Shire of Esperance